Samadu Okocha Awudu (born 15 September 1984) is a retired Ghanaian football player. 
He played in Ghana for Hearts of Oak, in Austria for SC Bregenz, in Slovakia for FC Senec, in Israel for Maccabi Netanya, Bnei Sakhnin, Hapoel Acre & Hapoel Ramat Gan and in Thailand for Ratchaburi F.C.

He is commonly referred to by his nickname Okocha.

Club career statistics
(correct as of June 2011)

Honours
Ghana Premier League:
Winner (1): 2002
Israeli Premier League:
Runner-up (2): 2006–07, 2007–08

References

External links
  Official website
  Profile and statistics of Samed Abdul Awudu on One.co.il
 Profile of Samed Abdul Awudu on GhanaWeb.com

1984 births
Living people
Ghanaian footballers
Accra Hearts of Oak S.C. players
SW Bregenz players
FC Senec players
Maccabi Netanya F.C. players
Bnei Sakhnin F.C. players
Hapoel Acre F.C. players
Hapoel Ramat Gan F.C. players
Kelantan FA players
Samed Abdul Awudu
Slovak Super Liga players
Israeli Premier League players
Samed Abdul Awudu
Expatriate footballers in Slovakia
Expatriate footballers in Israel
Expatriate footballers in Malaysia
Expatriate footballers in Thailand
Ghanaian expatriate sportspeople in Slovakia
Ghanaian expatriate sportspeople in Israel
Ghanaian expatriate sportspeople in Malaysia
Ghanaian expatriate sportspeople in Thailand
Association football forwards